The tomahawk is a tool in geometry for angle trisection, the problem of splitting an angle into three equal parts. The boundaries of its shape include a semicircle and two line segments, arranged in a way that resembles a tomahawk, a Native American axe. The same tool has also been called the shoemaker's knife, but that name is more commonly used in geometry to refer to a different shape, the arbelos (a curvilinear triangle bounded by three mutually tangent semicircles).

Description
The basic shape of a tomahawk consists of a semicircle (the "blade" of the tomahawk), with a line segment the length of the radius extending along the same line as the diameter of the semicircle (the tip of which is the "spike" of the tomahawk), and with another line segment of arbitrary length (the "handle" of the tomahawk) perpendicular to the diameter. In order to make it into a physical tool, its handle and spike may be thickened, as long as the line segment along the handle continues to be part of the boundary of the shape.  Unlike a related trisection using a carpenter's square, the other side of the thickened handle does not need to be made parallel to this line segment.

In some sources a full circle rather than a semicircle is used, or the tomahawk is also thickened along the diameter of its semicircle,  but these modifications make no difference to the action of the tomahawk as a trisector.

Trisection

To use the tomahawk to trisect an angle, it is placed with its handle line touching the apex of the angle, with the blade inside the angle, tangent to one of the two rays forming the angle, and with the spike touching the other ray of the angle. One of the two trisecting lines then lies on the handle segment, and the other passes through the center point of the semicircle. If the angle to be trisected is too sharp relative to the length of the tomahawk's handle, it may not be possible to fit the tomahawk into the angle in this way, but this difficulty may be worked around by repeatedly doubling the angle until it is large enough for the tomahawk to trisect it, and then repeatedly bisecting the trisected angle the same number of times as the original angle was doubled.

Although the tomahawk may itself be constructed using a compass and straightedge, and may be used to trisect an angle, it does not contradict Pierre Wantzel's 1837 theorem that arbitrary angles cannot be trisected by compass and unmarked straightedge alone. The reason for this is that placing the constructed tomahawk into the required position is a form of neusis that is not allowed in compass and straightedge constructions.

History
The inventor of the tomahawk is unknown, but the earliest references to it come from 19th-century France.  It dates back at least as far as 1835, when it appeared in a book by Claude Lucien Bergery, Géométrie appliquée à l'industrie, à l'usage des artistes et des ouvriers (3rd edition). Another early publication of the same trisection was made by Henri Brocard in 1877; Brocard in turn attributes its invention to an 1863 memoir by French naval officer .

References

External links
Trisection using special tools: "Tomahawk", Takaya Iwamoto, 2006, featuring a tomahawk tool made from transparent vinyl and comparisons for accuracy against other trisectors

Construction heptagon with tomahawk, animation

Mathematical tools